Viasat Explore is a television channel owned by international media company, Viasat World LTD. The channel focuses on fishing, adventure, men at work and engineering. Viasat Explore is a 24-hour channel broadcasting in Central and Eastern Europe, Scandinavia, Russia and Commonwealth of Independent States.

With headquarters in London, United Kingdom, the channel started its broadcast in the Scandinavian countries and after a few years expanded to many East European markets and the Baltic countries with subtitles.

The service was launched in January 2002 as Viasat Explorer in Sweden, Denmark, Norway and Finland. On 1 November 2003 it expanded into Ukraine, Russia, Kazakhstan, Estonia, Latvia, Lithuania, Moldova, Belarus, Hungary, Poland, Romania and Bulgaria. In 2006, all Serbian cable operators and their satellite platform, Total TV began with broadcasting this channel.

Viasat Explore co-produces and acquires content from international distributors and production houses.

Since 2012, Viasat Explorer together with sisterchannels Viasat History and Viasat Nature are broadcast in HD together with the SD feed on the Viasat satellite platform. The channel was rebranded as Viasat Explore on 29 April 2014, gaining a new ident package and logo and dropping the "X" letter from its logo in flavour of an "E".

References

Pan-Nordic television channels
Television channels in Russia
Television channels in Sweden
Television channels in Norway
Television stations in Denmark

Modern Times Group
Television channels and stations established in 2002
Television channels in North Macedonia